The Albanian Civil Aviation Authority (AAC), formerly the General Directorate of Civil Aviation is the civil aviation authority of Albania, headquartered in Tirana.

References 

Authority
Albania
Civil aviation in Albania
Organizations established in 1991
1991 establishments in Albania
 
Transport organizations based in Albania